John Greenleaf Adams (1810–1897) was co-editor with Dr. E.H. Chapin of the Universalist Hymns for Christian Devotion and alone for the Gospel Psalmist, 1861.

Born in Portsmouth, New Hampshire, he married twice, including Mary Hall Barrett Adams; and had two sons and one daughter.  He was ordained in 1833 in Rumney, New Hampshire.

Although rarely used outside his denomination, best known of his hymns are 
 Heaven is here, its hymns of gladness
 God's angels; not only on high do they sing

His papers can be found at the Andover-Harvard Theological Library, Harvard Divinity School among which include correspondence with A. C. Thomas, Thomas Thayer, Lucius Paige, Moses Ballou, W. H. Ryder, J. W. Hanson, M. Goddard.

References

External links
 
 
 Personal papers of John Greenleaf Adams are in the Andover-Harvard Theological Library at Harvard Divinity School in Cambridge, Massachusetts.

American Protestant hymnwriters
1810 births
1897 deaths
American Unitarians
19th-century American writers
19th-century American musicians
People from Portsmouth, New Hampshire